Balkrishna Atmaram Gupte (1851–1925) was the assistant Director of Ethnography of India under Sir Herbert Hope Risley and later an Honorary Fellow of the Royal Society of Arts, London. He was the author of "Hindu Holidays And Ceremonials" and several other books. Later he was a professor at Calcutta. He was awarded the title "Rai Bahadur".

References

Further reading
 

1851 births
Place of birth missing
Date of birth missing
1925 deaths
Place of death missing
Date of death missing
Rai Bahadurs
19th-century Indian social scientists
20th-century Indian social scientists
Indian anthropologists